Tujhko Hai Salaam Zindagi is an Indian daily television series which premiered on 10 December 2007 on Sony TV. It takes the audience through the journey of Manya, an effervescent, energetic, and fun-filled girl. The series is produced by Sphere Origins.

Plot 
The show focuses on the life of the protagonist Manya, who has grown up with simple dreams...while at the moment she's just immersed herself in what her biggest passion - dance. The story takes a twist when Manya's biggest passion – dancing, clashes with the dreams of her grandfather, whose greatest loss was of his son who was a police inspector. Manya realizes her grandfather's dreams and leaves aside all her desires and firmly decides on becoming a successful police inspector. She makes a choice and faces all odds of the consequences of her actions.

To fulfill the dreams of her grandfather, Manya comes to the academy and is a complete underdog there. Her journey of gaining acceptance in the academy and ultimately going on to win the highest honour at the academy - the sword of honour and Manya finally becomes a cop, but her challenges are far from over...

In March 2008 three months into the show Sony cancelled the serial due to low TRPs (ratings).

Cast 
 Pariva Pranati ... Manya Sharma 
 Deepak Qazir / Madan Joshi ... Havaldar Vaidji (Manya's grandfather)
 Anita Kulkarni ... Meenakshi
 Gopi Desai ... Nani 
Parth Muni ... Montu
 Abhay Vakil ... Akash
 Simple Kaul ... Roopa
 Meghna Malik ... Officer Jyotsna
 Sachin Khurana ... Officer Khanna
 Manoj Bidwai ... Karan (Manya's soon-to-be husband)
 Tapasvi Mehta ... Vencell Mehta

References

External links 
Official Site
Official Site on SET Asia

2007 Indian television series debuts
2008 Indian television series endings
Indian television soap operas
Sony Entertainment Television original programming